A deodand is a thing forfeited or given to God, specifically, in law, an object or instrument that becomes forfeited because it has caused a person's death

Deodand may also refer to:
Deodand (fictional creature), the fictional creature from Jack Vance's Dying Earth
"Deodand" (Karl Schroeder), a novelette by Karl Schroeder